"The Lesson" is a short story by Toni Cade Bambara (1938–1995). It was first published in 1972.

The Lesson” is a first-person narrative told by a young, black girl named Sylvia who is growing up in Harlem. The story is about a trip initiated by a well-educated woman named Miss Moore who has taken it upon herself to expose the unappreciative children of the neighborhood to the world outside of their oppressed community. The destination is the FAO Schwarz Toy Store in Manhattan, where the toys aimed at a white market are extremely expensive. Some cost more than the children’s household yearly incomes. The children contemplate the extreme prices. Miss Moore uses the trip to demonstrate how an unjust economic and social system creates unfair access to money and resources for black Americans. The lesson on economic inequality is almost lost on the children, who, too contemptuous to open themselves up to the education offered them by the well-intended Miss Moore, close the story by making plans to spend the leftover cab fare change. In the end, however, Sylvia seeks solitude to contemplate the events of the day. The narrator has found a way to direct her own anger and spouts "ain't nobody gonna beat me at nuthin," illustrating how the two main characters choose different paths at the end of the story.
This story also emphasizes that individuals who are segregated to certain environments should not be condescended to, as Miss Moore, the educated outsider, creates resistance with her patronizing.

References

Sources
Friedman, Joe. "Review of Toni Cade Bambara's "The Lesson". HubPages.HubPages Inc. 2011. Web. 24 Oct. 2011.
Short Stories for Students. "The Lesson". Book Rags. Gale Group. 2000-07. Web. 24 Oct. 2011.
Andrew, Richard. “The Man Who Was Almost a Man.” The Story and Its Writer. Ed. Ann Charters. Compact 8th ed. California: Bedford/St. Martin’s, 2011. 878-87. Print.

1972 short stories
New York City in fiction
African-American short stories
Short stories by Toni Cade Bambara
Literature by African-American women